The Piratini River is a river of Rio Grande do Sul state in southern Brazil.

See also
List of rivers of Rio Grande do Sul

References

Brazilian Ministry of Transport

Rivers of Rio Grande do Sul